The 2023 Campbell Fighting Camels football team will represent the Campbell University as a member of the Colonial Athletic Association during the 2023 NCAA Division I FCS football season. They were formerly in the Big South and this will be their first year in the Colonial Athletic Association after switching conferences. They will be led by tenth-year head coach Mike Minter, the Fighting Camels play their home games at the Barker–Lane Stadium in Buies Creek, North Carolina.

Previous season

The Fighting Camels finished the 2022 season with an overall record of 5–6 and a mark of 2–3 in conference play to place in a tie for third in the Big South.

Schedule

References

Campbell
Campbell Fighting Camels football seasons
Campbell Fighting Camels football